is a military aerodrome of the Japan Maritime Self-Defense Force . Runway 08R/26L is equipped with ILS.

On April 6, 2016 a U-125 airplane operated by the Flight Check Squadron of the Japan Air Self-Defense Force crashed near the base, and all six crew members were killed. It had been checking the base's air navigation aid system.

After some years of discussion it was announced in July 2018 that the base would be used by the US military. United States Marine Corps KC-130 aerial tankers will use the base.

The Kanoya Air Base Museum is located at the base.

References

Airports in Japan
Airports in Kagoshima Prefecture
Japan Maritime Self-Defense Force bases